Minuscule 127 (in the Gregory-Aland numbering), A124 (Soden), is a Greek minuscule manuscript of the New Testament, on parchment leaves. Palaeographically it has been assigned to the 11th century. The manuscript has complex contents; marginalia are incomplete.

Description 

The codex contains the text of the four Gospels on 378 thick parchment leaves (size ). The text is written in one column per page, 26 lines per page. The ink is brown, the large initials in red.

There is space and lines stand blank for a commentary, but it was seldom written.

It is neatly written, with a few corrections added by a later hand (e.g. Matthew 27:49).

There is also another division according to the smaller Ammonian Sections (in Mark 233 sections, the last in 16:8), but there is no references to the Eusebian Canons.

Text 

The Greek text of the codex is a representative of the Byzantine text-type. Aland placed it in Category V.

According to the Claremont Profile Method it creates textual cluster 127. It is close to minuscule 132.

History 

The manuscript was examined by Birch (about 1782). C. R. Gregory saw the manuscript in 1886.

The manuscript is currently housed at the Vatican Library (Vat. gr. 349), at Rome.

See also 

 List of New Testament minuscules
 Biblical manuscript
 Textual criticism

References

Further reading 

 

Greek New Testament minuscules
11th-century biblical manuscripts
Manuscripts of the Vatican Library